Herbert C. Broomfield (born 11 December 1878) was an English footballer who played as a goalkeeper. Born in Audlem, Cheshire, he played for Northwich Wednesday, Northwich Victoria, Bolton Wanderers, Manchester City and Manchester United.

External links
Profile at StretfordEnd.co.uk
Profile at MUFCInfo.com

1878 births
Year of death missing
People from Cheshire
English footballers
Northwich Victoria F.C. players
Bolton Wanderers F.C. players
Manchester United F.C. players
Manchester City F.C. players
Sportspeople from Cheshire
Association football goalkeepers